Lysophosphatidic acid receptor 2 also known as LPA2 is a protein that in humans is encoded by the LPAR2 gene. LPA2 is a G protein-coupled receptor that binds the lipid signaling molecule lysophosphatidic acid (LPA).

Function 
This gene encodes a member of family I of the G protein-coupled receptors, as well as the EDG family of proteins. This protein functions as a lysophosphatidic acid (LPA) receptor and contributes to Ca2+ mobilization, a critical cellular response to LPA in cells, through association with Gi and Gq proteins.

Interactions
LPAR2 has been shown to interact with TRIP6.

See also
 Lysophospholipid receptor

References

Further reading

External links

 

G protein-coupled receptors